Long Yiming (born October 1948) is a Chinese researcher, mathematician, and professor at Nankai University. He is a fellow of the Chinese Academy of Sciences.

His research focuses on symplectic geometry, nonlinear functional analysis, celestial mechanics, the variation method, and the Hamiltonian system.

He is a distinguished professor of the Changjiang Scholars Program and the Director-General of the Chinese Mathematical Society.

Education

Between 1978 and 1981, he was a student at Nankai University, where he obtained a master's degree. Between August 1983 and December 1987, he was a student at the University of Wisconsin-Madison, where he received a doctorate degree in mathematics.

References

Living people
Members of the Chinese Academy of Sciences
Chinese scientists
1948 births